USS Sebago was a large steamer with very powerful guns and four howitzers, purchased by the Union Navy during the beginning of the American Civil War.

With her large crew of 156 sailors, she served the Union Navy during the blockade of ports and waterways of the Confederate States of America as a gunboat.

Built by the Portsmouth Navy Yard in 1861
Sebago — a double-ended, sidewheel gunboat built by the Portsmouth Navy Yard, Kittery, Maine — was launched on 30 November 1861; and commissioned on 26 March 1862, Lieutenant Edmund W. Henry in command.

Civil war service

Assigned to the North Atlantic blockade
Sebago departed Portsmouth, New Hampshire on 6 April 1862 and headed for Hampton Roads, Virginia, to join the North Atlantic Blockading Squadron and reached Newport News, Virginia on the 11th.

She was ordered to the York River to support General George B. McClellan's push up the peninsula toward Richmond, Virginia, and operated in that river and its tributaries supporting Union Army operations.

Then, on 30 June, after General Robert E. Lee had defeated McClellan in the Seven Days campaign and had driven the Army of the Potomac from the York to the James River, Sebago steamed downstream, rounded Old Point Comfort, and ascended the James escorting Army transports.

Reassigned to the South Atlantic blockade
Transferred to the South Atlantic Blockading Squadron later that month, Sebago departed Hampton Roads on 25 July and arrived off Charleston, South Carolina, on the 29th to begin a year of blockade duty off the approaches to that important and historic Southern port.

On 18 June 1863, the double ender ran aground in Wassaw Sound and suffered some damage. As she was due for an overhaul, she sailed north on 29 July and was decommissioned at the New York Navy Yard on 9 July.

Reassigned to the Gulf of Mexico 
Repairs and overhaul completed, Sebago was recommissioned on 2 December and sailed for the Gulf of Mexico for duty in the West Gulf Blockading Squadron in which she served through the end of the Civil War.

The highlight of her operations in the gulf came on 5 August 1864, when she participated in the Battle of Mobile Bay.

Post-war deactivation
After peace returned, Sebago sailed north and was decommissioned at the New York Navy Yard on 29 July 1865. She was sold at New York City on 19 January 1867.

References 

Ships of the Union Navy
Ships built in Kittery, Maine
Steamships of the United States Navy
Gunboats of the United States Navy
American Civil War patrol vessels of the United States
1861 ships